The Saint Sebastian River is a river in the U.S. state of Florida, a tributary of the Indian River west and north of the city of Sebastian.

Dredging 
Dredging took place from 2006 through 2009, costing $18 million and removing  of muck from the bottom of the St. Sebastian River. The muck consisted of silt, clay, sand, shell and organic material, which consumed oxygen and threatened the life of aquatic species.

See also 
 St. Sebastian River Preserve State Park

References 

Rivers of Florida
Bodies of water of Indian River County, Florida
Tributaries of the Indian River (Florida)